Kilkea is a village in County Kildare, Ireland, about  from Dublin, and  from the town of Carlow. The R418 regional road from Athy to Tullow passes through the village.

History
Formerly the land of the Ó Tuathails (O'Toole), after the Norman invasion, Sir Walter de Riddlesford built a motte and bailey castle there about 1180. It is part of the barony of Kilkea and Moone. Walter de Riddlesford granddaughter, Emmeline Longespee, married Maurice FitzGerald, 3rd Lord of Offaly in 1273, and so the land passed to the Geraldine Earls of Kildare. Its importance as a town diminished after the rebellion of "Silken Thomas", the 10th Earl of Kildare, in 1534.

People
 Ernest Shackleton (1874–1922), Antarctic explorer, was born and spent his childhood at Kilkea House.
Lorcán Ua Tuathail (1128-1180)

See also
 Kilkea Castle
 Kilkea and Moone, the barony
 List of towns and villages in Ireland

References

External links
 
 Joe Greene and the lock out

Towns and villages in County Kildare